Willard G. Graham (1882 – February 10, 1958) was an American cricketer. He was a left-handed batsman and a left-arm spin bowler. He played seven first-class matches between 1901 and 1913. Six of these were for the Philadelphian cricket team, the other for a combined Canada/USA team against Australia in 1913, which was his final first-class match.

References

1882 births
1958 deaths
Cricketers from Philadelphia
Philadelphian cricketers